Stevioside is a glycoside derived from the stevia plant, which can be used as a sweetener. Evidence of benefit is lacking for long-term effects on weight loss and heart disease risks.

Origin 

Stevioside is the main sweetener (along with rebaudioside A) found in the leaves of Stevia rebaudiana, a plant originating in South America. Dried leaves, as well as aqueous extracts, have been used for decades as a sweetener in many countries, notably in Latin America and Asia (Japan, China). Stevioside was discovered in 1931 by French chemists who gave it its name. The sweetening power of stevioside was estimated to be about 300 times stronger than cane sugar.

See also 
 Steviol glycoside

References 

Glucosides
Stevia (genus)
Vinylidene compounds